Heiwajima Station is a railway station of the
Keihin Electric Express Railway located in Ōta, Tokyo, Japan.

Lines

 Keikyū Main Line

Station layout

The station has two island platforms. Both platforms are on the upper level and connected by stairs, escalators and elevators to the ground level where ticket office, gates and toilets are located.

History
The present name Heiwajima was given 1 September 1961. The platforms were moved to the elevated tracks in 1970.

Keikyu introduced station numbering to its stations on 21 October 2010; Heiwajima was assigned station number KK08.

Around the station

To the east of the station is Heiwanomori-Kōen (平和の森公園) park.

References

External links
 Heiwanomori-Kōen Park 
  Heiwanomori-Kōen Archery fields 

Railway stations in Japan opened in 1901
Keikyū Main Line
Stations of Keikyu
Railway stations in Tokyo